The MAA Certificate of Merit is awarded at irregular intervals by the Mathematical Association of America for special work or service to mathematics or the broader mathematics community.

Recipients 
The recipients of the MAA Certificate of Merit are:

 1977: Henry M. Cox
 1978: Samuel L. Greitzer
 1978: Murray S. Klamkin
 1978: Nura D. Turner
 1983: Hope Daly
 1986: Raoul Hailpern
 1988: Walter E. Mientka
 1994: I. Edward Block
2021: Mary W. Gray

See also

 List of mathematics awards

References 

Awards of the Mathematical Association of America